Rodor may refer to:
Aristotle Rodor, a character in the DC Comics who invented the Question mask
Matvei Rodor or Zuggernaut, a supervillain character in the DC comics

See also
Rotor (disambiguation)